The 2021–22 Nebraska Cornhuskers men's basketball team represented the University of Nebraska–Lincoln in the 2021–22 NCAA Division I men's basketball season. The Cornhuskers were led by third-year head coach Fred Hoiberg and played their home games at Pinnacle Bank Arena in Lincoln, Nebraska as members of the Big Ten Conference. They finished the season 10–22, 4–16 in Big Ten play to finish in a tie for last place. As the No. 13 seed in the Big Ten tournament, they lost to Northwestern in the first round.

Previous season
In a season limited due to the ongoing COVID-19 pandemic, the Cornhuskers finished the 2019–20 season 7–20, 3–16 in Big Ten play to finish last place. As the No. 14 seed in the Big Ten tournament, the Cornhuskers lost to No. 11-seeded Penn State.

Offseason

Departures
Due to COVID-19, the NCAA ruled that the 2020–21 season would not count against the eligibility of any competitor in any of the organization's winter sports, including basketball. This in turn meant that all players active in the 2020–21 season, regardless of their academic classification, could return in 2021–22. This also led the NBA and its players union to agree that graduating seniors, who are normally automatically eligible for the NBA draft, had to declare their eligibility for the 2021 draft.

Incoming transfers

2021 recruiting class
On November 13, 2020, five-star shooting guard Bryce McGowens committed to Nebraska. McGowens became Nebraska's first five-star commit and highest-ranked recruit in program history. Wilhelm Breidenbach, Oleg Kojenets, Quaran McPherson, and Keisei Tominaga rounded out the 2021 class.

Roster

Schedule and results

|-
!colspan=9 style=|Exhibition

|-

|-
!colspan=9 style=|Regular Season

|-
!colspan=9 style=|Big Ten tournament

|-

References

Nebraska Cornhuskers men's basketball seasons
Nebraska
Nebraska